The National Academy of Popular Music (NAPM) is an American organization which administers the Songwriters Hall of Fame, and sponsors a series of workshops and showcases for the songwriting profession.  It was formed in 1988 by Sammy Cahn and Bob Leone.

References 
 NAPM history

Sammy Cahn

Music organizations based in the United States
1988 establishments in the United States